Aidenbach is a municipality in the district of Passau in Bavaria in Germany.

References

Passau (district)